Benjamin LaPresta (January 22, 1909 – August 1975) was an American football running back in the National Football League for the Boston Redskins, the Cincinnati Reds, and the St. Louis Gunners.  He played college football at St. Louis University.

1909 births
1975 deaths
American football running backs
Boston Redskins players
Cincinnati Reds (NFL) players
Saint Louis Billikens football players
St. Louis Gunners players
People from Bellevue, Ohio